Ong Yu En (born 3 October 2003) is a Singaporean footballer currently playing as a midfielder for Tampines Rovers, a football club based in Singapore.

Club career

Albirex Niigata (S)
Ong started his professional football career by signing for the Singapore Premier League side, Albirex Niigata (S) on 16 December 2019. 

On 18 October 2020, Ong made his first professional debut with Albirex Niigata (S) against Young Lions by coming on as a substitution for Ryosuke Nagasawa in the 86th minute, playing till the end of the match.

Ong won his first-ever major trophy in professional football by winning the 2020 Singapore Premier League with Albirex Niigata (S).

South Korea training
In December 2022, it was announced that Yu En with Fathullah Rahmat will train with K-League 1 sides Incheon United and Suwon Samsung Bluewings youth team and senior squad of K-League 2 club Cheonan City from 26 December 2022 to 5 January 2023.

Career statistics

Club

Notes

Honours

Club

Albirex Niigata (S) 

 Singapore Premier League: 2020

References

2003 births
Living people
Singaporean footballers
Singaporean sportspeople of Chinese descent
Association football midfielders
Singapore Premier League players
Albirex Niigata Singapore FC players
Tampines Rovers FC players